Charles Edward Bradley (November 5, 1948 – September 23, 2017) was an American singer.  After years of obscurity and a part-time music career, Bradley came to prominence in his early 50s. His performances and recording style were consistent with the revivalist approach of his main label Daptone Records, celebrating the feel of funk and soul music from the 1960s and 1970s.  One review said he "echoes the evocative delivery of Otis Redding".

Called "The Screaming Eagle of Soul", Bradley was the subject of the documentary Soul of America which premiered at South by Southwest in 2012.

Early life

Abandoned by his mother at eight months of age, Bradley was raised by his maternal grandmother in Gainesville, Florida. At age eight, his mother returned, and took him to live with her in Brooklyn, New York.

In 1962, his sister took him to the Apollo Theater to see James Brown perform. Bradley was so inspired by the performance that he began to practice mimicking Brown's style of singing and stage mannerisms at home.

When he was fourteen, Bradley ran away from home to escape poor living conditions—his bedroom was in a basement with a sand floor—and lived on the streets during the day and slept nights in subway cars for two years. Later, he enlisted in Job Corps which eventually led him to Bar Harbor, Maine to train as a chef. A co-worker told him he looked like James Brown and asked if he could sing; he was at first shy but then admitted that he could.  He overcame his stage fright (when a crew member pushed him through the curtains onto the stage) and performed five or six times with a band. His bandmates were later drafted into the Vietnam War, and the act never re-formed.

Bradley worked in Maine as a cook for ten years, and then decided to head west, hitchhiking across the country. He lived in upstate New York, Seattle, Canada and Alaska before settling in California in 1977.  There, Bradley worked odd jobs and played small shows for 20 years. He earned extra money doing James Brown performances, where he used such stage names as the Screaming Eagle of Soul, Black Velvet and even James Brown Jr.

Career in music

Black Velvet and initial recordings (1996–2010)
In the mid 1990s, Bradley's mother called him and asked him to move back in with her in Brooklyn so she could get to know him. It was there he began making a living moonlighting as a James Brown impersonator in local clubs under the name "Black Velvet". During this time, Bradley experienced more difficulties, including almost dying in a hospital after having an allergic reaction to penicillin, and, in a separate episode, awaking at his mother's house to a commotion as police and ambulances were arriving to the scene of his brother's murder, just down the road from there.

While performing as "Black Velvet", he was eventually discovered by Gabriel Roth (better known as "Bosco Mann"), a co-founder of Daptone Records. Roth introduced Bradley to his future producer, Daptone artist Tom Brenneck (then the songwriter and guitarist for The Bullets, and later for Menahan Street Band) who invited Bradley to his band's rehearsal. Bradley asked that the band simply perform while he made up lyrics on the spot. After writing several songs, Daptone released some of these initial recordings on vinyl starting in 2002.

No Time for Dreaming & Soul of America (2011–2012)

Brenneck and Bradley chose ten of these recordings to be released as Bradley's debut album No Time for Dreaming in 2011.

In the spring of 2012, Soul of America, a documentary directed by Poull Brien, debuted at the SXSW Film Festival in Austin, Texas. Poull Brien first met Bradley when he directed the music video for "The World (Is Going Up In Flames)". This feature film told  Bradley's story from his childhood in Florida, to the days of homelessness and heartache, then later his gigs as Black Velvet, and finally ended with him touring and recording at Daptone Records. The film included his performance at festivals around the world.

In 2014 Bradley took part in the Hamilton, Ontario Supercrawl event.

Victim of Love & Changes (2013–2016)
Bradley's second album, Victim of Love came out on April 2, 2013. Bradley's third album, Changes, was released on April 1, 2016, and featured a cover of the Black Sabbath song "Changes".  In August 2016, he fell ill and canceled a Canadian tour and his appearance at the Cambridge Folk Festival July 30 (UK), where the band Darlingside filled in for him.

Death
Bradley died on September 23, 2017, of stomach cancer in Brooklyn, New York, at the age of 68. He was surrounded by family and friends, including members of all the bands he worked closely with, according to a press release from his publicist.

Discography

Studio albums

Singles

Other appearances

"Take It As It Comes" from The Sugarman 3 album Pure Cane Sugar (2002)
"Take It As It Comes" (Afrodisiac Soundsystem Remix) from the album Daptone Records Remixed (2007)
"Stay Away" (Nirvana cover) from Spin's Newermind album, a compilation of Nirvana covers (2011)
 Krampus (singing voice) American Dad!, episode "Minstrel Krampus" (2013)
"Grant Green" from the Mr Jukes album God First (2017)
"Otis" from Eddy Mitchell album La Même Tribu (2017)

References

External links

Charles Bradley in Soul of America

1948 births
2017 deaths
20th-century African-American male singers
Musicians from Brooklyn
American soul singers
American funk singers
Musicians from Gainesville, Florida
Singers from New York City
Singers from Florida
20th-century American singers
Daptone Records artists
Deaths from stomach cancer
Deaths from cancer in New York (state)
American rhythm and blues singers
20th-century American male singers
21st-century American male singers
21st-century American singers
21st-century African-American male singers